Machine Shop Records is a record label founded by American rock band Linkin Park members, Brad Delson and Mike Shinoda, in 2001. The label is notable for releasing music in rock, hip hop, underground hip hop, alternative rock and nu metal music amongst other genres.

The label is responsible for bringing up artists, such as Holly Brook (now known as Skylar Grey), Styles of Beyond, No Warning and Shinoda's side project Fort Minor. The label has marked up 80 releases as of 2014.

History

1999-2002: Early years

The label was originally known as The Shinoda Imprint, named after Mike Shinoda. Machine Shop was born in drummer Rob Bourdon's living room in 1999 when the band was packing CDs and stickers into boxes to send to their very first fans. The label only had the potential to release the extended plays for the band's fan club annually. Shinoda wanted to release albums of Linkin Park under the label, but the albums were already managed by the parent company Warner Bros. Records, and managing the albums on his alone basis was a difficult job. The first release under the label was for the fan club, LP Underground 2.0, which was released on November 18, 2002. The label also made available some enhanced features, such as T-shirts, sticker, key-chain, a band picture, guitar pick and membership card. The album was co produced by Don Gilmore with Shinoda. On November 17, 2003, the label released another extended play for the LPU fan club, entitled LP Underground 3.0, which featured the unreleased songs in the live album Live in Texas (which was released on November 18, 2003, through the record label).

2003-07: Mainstream success
The label was later renamed to Machine Shop after the involvement of the band members in the work. Brad Delson took over the work as an A&R representative of the label. The label got the breakthrough success after the release of the overnight recorded collaborative EP by Jay-Z and Linkin Park, entitled Collision Course, which was released under the collaboration of labels, Roc-A-Fella, Warner Bros. and Machine Shop. The EP was released on November 30, 2004. The EP was certified as Platinum in America. Later the label signed artists like No Warning, Simplistic and LNDN. Suffer, Survive became the first non-Linkin Park album and non shared label album to be released under the label. It was released on October 19, 2004. The album featured only 10 songs. The songs like, Dirtier Than the Next, Bad Timing and Hopeless Case gave a breakthrough success to the band and indirectly to the label. On November 18, 2003, the live album by Linkin Park Live in Texas was released under the label and Warner Bros. which was also certified as Platinum. It was also released as a DVD which featured Chester Bennington breaking Brad Delson's guitar. At the end of the concert, Joe Hahn threw a piece of his equipment on the stage floor.

On November 22, 2005, the label again marked its success on releasing the album The Rising Tied by Fort Minor which was a side project by the founder Shinoda. Under the success of the album many artists like Styles of Beyond and Holly Brook were signed in the label. Holly Brook released two independent EPs Holly Brook EP and Sony CONNECT Sets under the label, whereas Styles of Beyond indirectly released singles in which they were featured through the project of Fort Minor. The singles by Fort Minor like Petrified/Remember the Name gave success to S.O.B. and Fort Minor. The breakthrough single Where'd You Go featuring Holly Brook marked number four on the Billboard Hot 100 making it the best ever debut song by any One-Hit-Wonder. The label meanwhile was also releasing EPs for Linkin Park Underground, and in addition it also released an EP for the fan club of Fort Minor, Militia. The label also released mixtapes like We Major and Razor Tag. The signing of S.O.B. brought the group back into the spotlight and marked success. On May 23, 2006, the label released Like Blood Like Honey by Holly Brook which was her debut album, which gave her the spot of #23 of U.S. Heat charts. In 2006, the label again gained spotlight after the single Numb/Encore by Linkin Park & Jay-Z won the Grammy Award for Best Rap/Sung Collaboration. On October 10, 2005, the label released a mixtape of its own which was named as Machine Shop Mixtape. It featured Various Artists like Taproot, Papa Roach, Deftones and many others.

Hiatus: 2007-2009 
Mike Shinoda has stated on his blog that, as of January 2009, Machine Shop Recordings will be on hiatus due to disagreements between the label and its parent company Warner Bros. Records. On 23 May 2010 Shinoda stated a new release was likely, suggesting that they are looking to the UK for new releases. The label then released the album only in America. The label then signed out artists like Holly Brook and Styles of Beyond, due to disagreements with Warner Bros. Records. Although there weren't many releases during this course of time, the label missed the release of the score album by Linkin Park Transformers: Revenge of the Fallen – The Score.

After hiatus: 2009-present 
The first release by the label after hiatus is Download to Donate like Download to Donate for Haiti, Download to Donate for Haiti V2.0 and Download to Donate: Tsunami Relief. This project was handled by Shinoda and Enrique Iglesias. Later the release of 8-bit Rebellion! marked the return of the label, in America. The first big release after hiatus is A Thousand Suns by Linkin Park which was released on September 14, 2010. The album landed on the top of Billboard 200 marking the return to the mainstream success of label. later the success was Living Things, Recharged and The Hunting Party which marked mainstream success in United States.
In 2013 the label again released a non-Linkin Park album Resurrection of the Wolf only in US, No Warning after the band reunited. 
The label also released soundtrack album Mall. The label releases the singles by the band only in the United States, the release in other countries is released under the parent label. The label also released The Hunting Party outside the US for the first time after hiatus in Australia.

Artists

Current acts

Former acts

Current producers
Mike Shinoda
Brad Delson
Rob Cavallo

Past producers
Rick Rubin
Scoop DeVille
DJ Green Lantern
DJ Cheapshot 
Vin Skully 
Jay-Z

Discography
The following is the list of all albums released through Machine Shop Records and distributed by Warner Bros. Records. Any additional record label involved are specified.

Upcoming releases

Crew and employees
Mike Shinoda - Founder, President
Brad Delson - Founder, President
Bill Silva - Chief Operating Officer
Jessica Sklar - Chief Strategy Officer, Partner
Ryan DeMarti - Director of Operations
Trish Evangelista - Project Manager
Lorenzo Errico - Digital Manager
Kymm Britton – publicity
Kas Mercer – publicity

See also 
 List of record labels

References

External links 
 Official site

Record labels established in 2004
American record labels
Warner Music labels
Alternative rock record labels
Vanity record labels